Leoncio Alonso González de Gregorio y Álvarez de Toledo, 22nd Duke of Medina Sidonia, GE (born 3 January 1956) is a Spanish aristocrat and historian. Born in Madrid, Medina Sidonia is the eldest son of Leoncio González de Gregorio y Martí and his wife Luisa Isabel Álvarez de Toledo, 21st Duchess of Medina Sidonia. The Duke is Professor of History at the University of Castile-La Mancha and of the Diplomatic School of the Ministry of Foreign Affairs and Cooperation.

Family
Medina Sidonia married firstly his distant cousin María Montserrat Viñamata y Martorell, younger daughter of Luis Viñamata y Emmanueli and The Countess of Alba de Liste, on 12 December 1983, and divorced in 1998. They had two children:

 Don Alonso Enrique González de Gregorio y Viñamata, 14th Duke of Fernandina (b. 1983)
 Doña María de la Soledad González de Gregorio y Viñamata (b. 1989)

The Duke married secondly Pamela García Damián, of Venezuelan origin, daughter of Armando García Liceaga y Pérez de Viñaspre and María Pilar Damián Gracia, in 2001.

Ancestry

Titles and styles

Titles
22nd Duke of Medina Sidonia, Grandee of Spain
18th Marquess of Villafranca del Bierzo, Grandee of Spain
17th Marquess of los Vélez, Grandee of Spain
26th Count of Niebla

Styles
 The Most Excellent The Count of Niebla (1956–2008)
 The Most Excellent The Duke of Medina Sidonia (2008– )

References

Sources
www.geneall.net
Elenco de Grandezas y Títulos Nobiliarios Españoles, Hidalguía Editions, 2008

|-

|-

|-

|-

1956 births
122
Marquesses of Spain
Counts of Spain
House of Medina Sidonia
Living people
Grandees of Spain